Jean-Marie Kélétigui (12 May 1932, Gnénankaha, French West Africa – 31 August 2010) was the Ivorian bishop of the Roman Catholic Diocese of Katiola from 7 July 1977, until his retirement on 10 October 2002. He was named Bishop Emeritus of Katiola until his death in 2010, aged 78.

References

1932 births
2010 deaths
20th-century Roman Catholic bishops in Ivory Coast
Place of death missing
Roman Catholic bishops of Katiola